Successful Story of a Bright Girl is a 2002 South Korean television series starring Jang Na-ra, Jang Hyuk, Han Eun-jung and Ryu Soo-young. It aired on SBS from March 13 to May 2, 2002, on Wednesdays and Thursdays at 21:55 for 16 episodes. The romantic comedy series recorded a peak viewership rating of 42.6%.

Plot 
Cha Yang-soon (Jang Na-ra) is a simple girl living in the countryside with her grandmother. She spends most of her time dreaming of someday meeting her Prince Charming; in her fantasy, she saves him from harm with her martial arts skills, and they live happily ever after. Han Gi-tae (Jang Hyuk) is the spoiled and arrogant president of a successful makeup company, Snowy Cosmetics. While in the country on business, Gi-tae goes parachuting and accidentally falls straight into Yang-soon's outdoor bathtub while she's taking a bath, and it's hate at first sight for the two.

Soon, dire circumstances impel Yang-soon to move to the city in search of a job that will allow her to settle her parents' massive financial debts. To earn all the necessary cash, she becomes a maid for a wealthy family and moves into their house. At her new job, she comes face-to-face with Gi-tae, who happens to be one of her employers. At first Yang-soon has trouble adjusting to city life; she gets bullied at school and doesn't get along with Gi-tae's girlfriend Yoon Na-hee (Han Eun-jung). But she soon makes friends with siblings Song Seok-gu (Yoon Tae-young) and Song Bo-bae (Choo Ja-hyun); Bo-bae becomes her best friend, and Seok-gu seems attracted to her. Also, the short-tempered Gi-tae slowly warms up to her as Yang-soon teaches him a thing or two about manners with her folksy, down-to-earth, no-nonsense approach to life.

But things take a serious turn when Gi-tae, the heir of the family business, finds himself betrayed by a pair of duplicitous family members: his rival and cousin Oh Joon-tae (Ryu Soo-young), and Joon-tae's father. Their behind-the-scenes intrigues lead to Gi-tae's professional downfall. Distraught by the situation and suddenly penniless, Gi-tae has no one to turn to except Yang-soon. She teaches him to stand on his own two feet, and with hard work and creativity, gain back everything he's lost.

Cast

Main 
Jang Na-ra as Cha Yang-soon
Jang Hyuk as Han Gi-tae

Supporting 

Han Eun-jung as Yoon Na-hee
Ryu Soo-young as Oh Joon-tae
Yoon Tae-young as Song Seok-gu
Choo Ja-hyun as Song Bo-bae
Jung Min as Young-chan, Gi-tae's friend
Oh Seung-eun as Jin-joo, Na-hee's friend
Lee Hye-sook as Moon Jung-im, Na-hee's mother
Hong Yo-seob as Director Oh, Joon-tae's father
Kwon Hae-hyo as Chief Joo, product development chief
Choi Yong-min as Chief of public relations
Lee Seung-hyung as Assistant chief of public relations
Kim Young-ok as Yang-soon's grandmother
Park Soon-chun as Yang-soon's mother
Jo Hyung-ki as Yang-soon's father

Accolades

2002 SBS Drama Awards 
Top Excellence Award, Actor: Jang Hyuk
Top 10 Stars: Jang Na-ra, Jang Hyuk
New Star Award: Ryu Soo-young, Han Eun-jung

2003 Baeksang Arts Awards 
Best New Actress (TV): Jang Na-ra

Remake 

A 2011 Taiwanese remake titled Sunny Girl (陽光天使; lit. "Sunshine Angel") starred Rainie Yang and Wu Chun in the lead roles.

An Indonesian remake was titled I Love You, Boss!.

References

External links 
Successful Story of a Bright Girl official SBS website 

2002 South Korean television series debuts
2002 South Korean television series endings
Seoul Broadcasting System television dramas
South Korean romantic comedy television series